Clinton is a community and census-designated place (CDP) located on southern Whidbey Island in Island County, Washington, United States. The town was named after Clinton, Michigan. As of the 2010 census, the village was 928. However, the post office serves at least 2,500 people.

Clinton is the western terminus of the Whidbey Island (Clinton)-to-Mukilteo Washington State Ferries route. It is served by State Route 525 and several major county roads.

Even though the village area of Clinton is small, people as far as 7 miles (11.5 km) away consider Clinton to be their home. Much of the village is situated on a high bluff overlooking Saratoga Passage on Puget Sound. The community of Columbia Beach, however, rests at sea level. To the north of the ferry dock is old Clinton, where the community started.

There are two grocery stores in Clinton, one in the downtown area and another a few miles west, at what has been named Ken's Korner. Additionally, Clinton has a Dairy Queen, the only fast food restaurant on the south end of Whidbey Island. The Sno-Isle Regional Library System recently built a library, supported by the "Friends of the Clinton Library".

Based on per capita income, Clinton ranks 79th of 522 areas in the state of Washington to be ranked. It is also the highest rank achieved in Island County.

Geography
Clinton is located at  (47.976194, -122.356245).

Demographics
As of the census of 2000, there were 868 people, 388 households, and 254 families residing in the CDP. The population density was 903.4 people per square mile (349.1/km2). There were 519 housing units at an average density of 540.2/sq mi (208.7/km2). The racial makeup of the CDP was 92.51% White, 1.04% African American, 1.04% Native American, 2.19% Asian, 0.35% from other races, and 2.88% from two or more races. Hispanic or Latino of any race were 1.04% of the population.

There were 388 households, out of which 22.9% had children under the age of 18 living with them, 52.6% were married couples living together, 9.8% had a female householder with no husband present, and 34.3% were non-families. 27.3% of all households were made up of individuals, and 10.1% had someone living alone who was 65 years of age or older. The average household size was 2.24 and the average family size was 2.68.

In the CDP, the population was spread out, with 20.2% under the age of 18, 5.2% from 18 to 24, 23.4% from 25 to 44, 30.4% from 45 to 64, and 20.9% who were 65 years of age or older. The median age was 46 years. For every 100 females, there were 95.9 males. For every 100 females age 18 and over, there were 90.9 males.

The median income for a household in the CDP was $43,625, and the median income for a family was $51,667. Males had a median income of $42,188 versus $35,804 for females. The per capita income for the CDP was $25,671. About 6.1% of families and 7.1% of the population were below the poverty line, including 4.4% of those under age 18 and none of those age 65 or over.

References

Census-designated places in Island County, Washington
Census-designated places in Washington (state)